Ellenberger Cottage is a historic cure cottage located at Saranac Lake in the town of Harrietstown, Franklin County, New York.  It was built in 1914 and is a -story, wood-frame dwelling on a  concrete block foundation, clad in wooden clapboard and shingles in staggered butt pattern and surmounted by a gable roof clad in asphalt shingles.  The building is inspired by Queen Anne style architecture and has a 1-story verandah with classically detailed columns and portico.

It was listed on the National Register of Historic Places in 1992.

References

Houses on the National Register of Historic Places in New York (state)
Queen Anne architecture in New York (state)
Houses completed in 1914
Houses in Franklin County, New York
National Register of Historic Places in Franklin County, New York